Waitstill is a given name. Notable people with the name include:

Waitstill R. Ranney (1791–1853), American physician and politician
Waitstill Sharp (1902–1983), American Unitarian minister
Waitstill Winthrop (1642 –1717), American magistrate and politician